Wellington Agramonte de los Santos (born 12 February 1987) is a Dominican footballer who plays as a goalkeeper for local club O&M FC and the Dominican Republic. His date of birth is also listed as 12 February 1989.

Agramonte represented the Dominican Republic in 2014 World Cup qualifiers, beginning with the preliminary match against the Cayman Islands on 11 November 2011.

References

External sources
 

1987 births
Living people
Dominican Republic footballers
Dominican Republic international footballers
Association football goalkeepers
San Cristóbal FC players
Atlético Pantoja players
Aigle Noir AC players
Cibao FC players
Universidad O&M FC players
Liga Dominicana de Fútbol players
Ligue Haïtienne players
Dominican Republic expatriate footballers
Dominican Republic expatriate sportspeople in Haiti
Dominican Republic expatriate sportspeople in Antigua and Barbuda
Expatriate footballers in Haiti
Expatriate footballers in Antigua and Barbuda
People from San Cristóbal Province